Refia Sultan ("exaltated"; 7 February 1842 – 4 January 1880) was an Ottoman princess, daughter of Sultan Abdulmejid I and his consort Gülcemal Kadın. She was full sister of Sultan Mehmed V of the Ottoman Empire.

Early life
Refia Sultan was born on 7 February 1842 in the Beşiktaş Palace. Her father was Sultan Abdulmejid I, and her mother was Gülcemal Kadın. She had an elder sister Fatma Sultan, one year elder then her, a twin sister Hatice Sultan, died as newborn, and a younger brother Mehmed V, two years younger than her.
Upon the death of her mother in 1851, she and her siblings were adopted by Abdulmejid's first consort, Servetseza Kadın.

Abdülmecid wanted all his sons and daughters to have a high-level and as complete as possible education, which included both traditional subjects, including Koranic studies, and Western ones. Refia's education began in 1847. She attended the lessons with her brother Şehzade Mehmed Reşad, her half-brothers Abdülhamid and Murad V, her sister Fatma Sultan and her half-sister Cemile Sultan. Her education continued ever after marriage. She also learnt Arabic and Persian. She also learnt French which became prominent during the Tanzimat era. She also learned French and Western music. She acquired her piano lessons from an Italian lady Therese Romano.

Marriage
On 22 February 1854, when Refia was twelve, Abdulmejid betrothed her to Mahmud Edhem Pasha, the son of Damat Mehmed Ali Pasha. Mehmed Ali Pasha had himself been married to Refia's aunt, Adile Sultan, with whom he had a son and three daughters, among them Hayriye Hanımsultan. Baronne Durand de Fontmagne, who lived in Istanbul for a year and a half in 1858-9 following the Crimean war, was shown the gifts about to be sent to Refia Sultan before her marriage. She noted that these included various preserves in 'not less than five hundred pots of very fine Dresden China'. The marriage took place on 21 July 1857, at the Topkapi Palace, and the couple were given a palace located at the Defterdarburnu as their residence. Among his ladies-in-waiting was Meyliservet Hanim, who would later become one of the consort of Refia's half-brother, Murad V .

She had a daughter died in infancy. The marriage turned out to be unhappy. It is understood from the letters that she wrote to her brothers that Edhem Pasha had a flirtatious behaviour. On the other hand, Edhem Pasha was not happy with this marriage because of the illness of Refia, who suffered from ovarian cysts, and other disagreements between the two of them. Refia, perhaps due to being ill herself, was very close to her half-sister Behice Sultan, who had contracted tuberculosis as a child and lived in isolation. Refia always sent Behice loving letters to cheer her up, even when she knew that her sister was on the verge of death.

Character
The generous personality of Refia was more apparent on special occasions such as festivals. During the Eid-al-Adha, she gave rams and sheep to some relatives, servants. The help and generosity of Refia Sultan attracted a great deal of attention.  As a matter of fact, due to her aid to the soldiers who were injured in the Russo-Turkish War (1877-78) and to the Muslim immigrants who had to leave their homes after the war. She was awarded with the order of charity by her half-brother Sultan Abdul Hamid.

In addition to her benevolence and generosity, Refia also was equally grand with her lavishness. Spending more than the income of the palace women in the 19th century and especially during the reign of her father Abdulmejid became almost a tradition. She was also raised in this period and was influenced by the passion of shopping and fashion of other women in the palace.  In fact, this was the result and necessity of a new lifestyle similar to that in the West. As a matter of fact, she ordered harnesses and carriages from Paris and her clothing and jewels needs.

The princess ordered goods and clothes from both Istanbul and France through her French teacher, Maria Tirard. Other foreign women, such as Tirard, who communicated with the palace, not only ensured the spread of western culture among the women of the palace but also provoked them to follow Western fashion.
In addition, she paid high sums to support two official photographers, Abdullah Fréres and Vasilaki Kargopoulo, and to commission several renowned artists to paint paintings of various sizes and charcoal drawings.

Death
Refia suffered throughout her life Ovarian cyst. The disease worsened starting in 1875. She died at the age of thirty seven on 4 January 1880, following a long sufference and several operations. She died only a week after last surgery. She is buried alongside her mother in the mausoleum of the imperial ladies at the New Mosque, Istanbul.

Honours

Order of Charity, 1st class, 1877-78

See also
 List of Ottoman princesses

Ancestry

References

Sources
 
 
 
 

1842 births
1880 deaths
19th-century Ottoman princesses